= Locicortolone =

Chemical compound

Clinical data
- Other names: Locicortone; RU-24476; 9α,11β-Dichloro-21-hydroxy-16α-methylpregna-1,4-diene-3,20-dione
- Drug class: Corticosteroid; Glucocorticoid

Identifiers
- IUPAC name: (8S,9R,10S,11S,13S,14S,16R,17S)-9,11-Dichloro-17-(2-hydroxyacetyl)-10,13,16-trimethyl-7,8,11,12,14,15,16,17-octahydro-6H-cyclopenta[a]phenanthren-3-one
- CAS Number: 65049-45-8
- PubChem CID: 12905327
- ChemSpider: 32698996
- UNII: 9R09I46GBS
- CompTox Dashboard (EPA): DTXSID70215366

Chemical and physical data
- Formula: C_{22}H_{28}Cl_{2}O_{3}
- Molar mass: 411.36 g·mol^{−1}
- 3D model (JSmol): Interactive image
- SMILES: C[C@@H]1C[C@H]2[C@@H]3CCC4=CC(=O)C=C[C@@]4([C@]3([C@H](C[C@@]2([C@H]1C(=O)CO)C)Cl)Cl)C
- InChI: InChI=1S/C22H28Cl2O3/c1-12-8-16-15-5-4-13-9-14(26)6-7-21(13,3)22(15,24)18(23)10-20(16,2)19(12)17(27)11-25/h6-7,9,12,15-16,18-19,25H,4-5,8,10-11H2,1-3H3/t12-,15+,16+,18+,19-,20+,21+,22+/m1/s1; Key:FKRMBGXNTOTQDI-IIEHVVJPSA-N

Locicortolone (developmental code name RU-24476), or locicortone, is a synthetic glucocorticoid corticosteroid which was never marketed.
